= South Carolina Gamecocks basketball =

South Carolina Gamecocks basketball may refer to either of the basketball teams that represent the University of South Carolina:

- South Carolina Gamecocks men's basketball
- South Carolina Gamecocks women's basketball
